Ebino VLF transmitter is a large transmitter for transmitting orders to submerged submarines, situated near Ebino, Miyazaki in Japan. Ebino VLF transmitter, which was completed in 1991, is used by the Japanese Navy to transmit orders to submerged submarines on the frequency 22.1 kHz with the callsign JJI. The antenna system is carried by eight masts, each 270 metres tall, which are arranged in two rows.

Towers in Japan
Military installations of Japan
1991 establishments in Japan
Towers completed in 1991